MFR may refer to:

 Rogue Valley International–Medford Airport, IATA code
 Marine Forces Reserve
 Medical first responder
 Melt flow rate of thermoplastic polymers
 Member of the Order of the Federal Republic, one of the Nigerian National Honours
 Methanofuran, a chemical compound
 Minimum funding requirement
 Mixed Flow Reactor, a type of chemical reactor
 Moray Firth Radio, a Scottish commercial radio station based in Inverness
 Music for Relief, a charity organisation founded by Linkin Park
 Myofascial release
 Météo-France